A glass run channel is a groove, normally made of rubber or plastic, that is found around windows (most commonly car windows). The primary purpose of a glass run channel is to provide a seal for the window.

Cleaning
Due to the channel's narrowness, glass runs can be difficult to clean (or free from small obstructions like glass chips) without the use of a specialised cleaner.

See also
 Automotive weatherstripping

References

Automotive body parts
Car windows